The Adio (also called Iddio or Makaraka) are an ethnic group indigenous to Central Africa, closely related to the powerful Azande or NiamNiam, occupying the Bahr-el-Ghazal west of Lado. They came originally from the country of the Kibas, north of the Welle River. They do not extract the incisors.

Currently, they form part of the population of the South Sudanese state of Central Equatoria. The Adio speak Kakwa and Mundu.

References

Gurtong Peace Project

Ethnic groups in South Sudan